Waley is a surname. Notable people with this name include:

Alison Waley (1901–2001), New Zealand poet, journalist, artist and writer
Arthur Waley (born Arthur David Schloss; 1889–1966), English orientalist and sinologist
Daniel Waley (1921–2017), British historian, manuscript specialist, and professor
 Harmon Metz Waley (1910–1984), American criminal convicted for his role in the George Weyerhaeuser kidnapping
Jacob Waley (1818–1873), English legal writer, grandfather of Charles Waley Cohen, Dorothea Waley Singer, and Robert Waley Cohen
Jim Waley (born 1948), Australian television presenter
Paul Waley, British academic, greatnephew of Arthur Waley
Robert Waley (1889–1939), Australian coxswain
Samuel Waley (born 1983), Tasmanian-born Australian rower
Simon Waley (1827–1875), English composer, banker, and leading figure in the Jewish community, younger brother of Jacob Waley

Variants

Waley Cohen
 Charles Waley Cohen (1879–1963), British soldier, barrister, and politician, brother of Dorothea Waley Singer
 Dorothea Waley Singer (née Cohen; 1882–1964), British palaeographer and historian of science, sister of Robert Waley Cohen
 Robert Waley Cohen (1877–1952), British industrialist and prominent Jewish leader, father of Bernard Waley-Cohen

Waley-Cohen
 Freya Waley-Cohen (born 1989), British-American composer
 Joanna Waley-Cohen (born 1952), English academic
 Robert Waley-Cohen (born 1948), English entrepreneur, father of Sam Waley-Cohen
 Sam Waley-Cohen (born 1982), English jockey and entrepreneur
 Waley-Cohen baronets, a title in the Baronetage of the United Kingdom
 Bernard Waley-Cohen (1914–1991), 1st Baronet, father of Stephen Waley-Cohen, Robert Waley-Cohen, and Joanna Waley-Cohen
 Stephen Waley-Cohen (born 1946), 2nd Baronet, theatre manager and producer, father of Freya Waley-Cohen

Waleys
Thomas Waleys (fl. 1333), English theologian

Other uses
 "DJ Waley Babu", a 2015 Punjabi-Hindi hip-hop single
 Mehndi Waley Hath, a 2000 Punjabi Pakistani film

See also

Whaley (surname)